New Addington North is a ward in the London Borough of Croydon, covering part of the New Addington estate in London in the United Kingdom. The ward currently forms part of the Croydon Central constituency.

The ward returns two councillors every four years. On 6 May 2021, 5 by-elections were held in Croydon following the resignation of 5 councillors across New Addington North, South Norwood, Kenley, Park Hill and Whitgift and Woodside.

List of Councillors

Mayoral election results 
Below are the results for the candidate which received the highest share of the popular vote in the ward at each mayoral election.

Ward results

References

External links
Council Elections 2006 results - Fieldway
Conservative Councillors for Croydon.
London Borough of Croydon map of wards.

Wards of the London Borough of Croydon